Michael Collins (born 4 June 1964) is an Irish novelist and international ultra-distance runner. His novel The Keepers of Truth was shortlisted for the 2000 Booker Prize. He has also won the Irish Novel of the Year Award  and the Lucien Barriere Literary Prize at the Deauville American Film Festival. Collins is a graduate of Oxford University.

Early life and education

Collins was born in Limerick. He earned an athletic scholarship to University of Notre Dame and received his PhD in Creative Writing from the Oxford University.

Athletics

A former member of the Irish National Team for the 100k distance (62.2 miles), Collins holds the Irish national masters record over the 100k distance. As captain of the Irish National Team in 2010, he won a bronze medal at the World 100k Championships held in Gibraltar. He has also won The 100-mile Himalayan Stage Race and The Mount Everest Challenge Marathon, along with The Last Marathon in Antarctica, and The North Pole Marathon.

Works

The Meat Eaters (short stories, also published as The Man who Dreamt of Lobsters), 1992
The Life and Times of a Teaboy, 1993
The Feminists Go Swimming, 1994, 
Emerald Underground, 1998
The Keepers of Truth, 2000
The Resurrectionists, 2003
Lost Souls, 2004
Death of a Writer (British title: The Secret Life of E. Robert Pendleton), 2006
Midnight in a Perfect Life (British title), 2010
The New Existence (British title: The Death of all Things Seen), 2016

Referenten

External links
 Michael Collins official website
 Profile, runnersworld.com

1964 births
Date of birth missing (living people)
Living people
Irish expatriates in the United States
Irish male long-distance runners
Writers from Limerick (city)
Irish ultramarathon runners
Irish male novelists
Male ultramarathon runners